Camden County can refer to:
Camden County, New Jersey, United States (the most populous county with the name)
Camden County, North Carolina, United States
Camden County, Missouri, United States
Camden County, Georgia, United States
Camden County, New South Wales, Australia
 Camden County, the fictitious setting of the television series My Name Is Earl